is a 2021 Japanese tokusatsu science fiction superhero film directed by Minoru Kawasaki. It is a reboot of Toei's Planet Prince franchise and the second theatrical film adaptation of the series.

Premise
200 years after his spaceship crashed landed on Earth. Planet Prince awakens from his sleep, rescuing the bakery's daughter Kimiko from a desperate pinch and deciding to stay at the bakery. As the planetary prince explored the earth, he interacted with the residents, occasionally replaced the top idols, and guarded the city from the alien invaders, the Turtans. The impact of the crash, however, caused most of his memory to be wiped out, and he had no idea how to return to the fourth planet. Although he became a hero, the Turtans later revealed that he was the universe's destroyer. Nana Oda, who worked with Sho Hinata on the former "Sakurazaka46", will play the role of the heroine and will play both Prince Planet and Kosuke Funaki.

Cast
 Sho Higano as Planet Prince / Kosuke Funaki
 Nana Oda as Kimiko Omura / Princess Claudia
 Jiro Dan as Planetary King
 Eiichi Kikuchi as Turtanu Royal Family
 Tsukasa Wakabayashi
 Shinzo Hotta
 Satoshi Kobayashi
 Hideto Suzuki
 Taira Yushin
 Mami Hase
 Yakan Nabe
 Eiji Ukulele
 Toshio Kobori
 Shimako Iwai
 Akihide Tsuzawa
 Akari Machi
 Nobuhiro Motohashi
 Takeharu Mikami
 Kon Arimura
 Motoko Obayashi
 Toshiyuki Someya
 Gota Nishidera
 Terumi Yoshida

References

External links
Official website

2021 films
2020s Japanese films
2020s Japanese superhero films
Tokusatsu films
Films directed by Minoru Kawasaki
Reboot films
2021 science fiction films
2020s superhero comedy films